Gold Series Vol.2 is the last album from Master Joe & O.G. Black. It is a collection of the best hits by the duo.

Track listing
Mil Amores
El Aroma De Tu Piel
Si Tu No Me Llamas
La Hija De Tuta
Oh Gial !
El Fake De La Esperanza
Aguajera
Entra Sin Ropa (feat. Sir Speedy)
Rompe Y Vacila
Llego La Hora
Celosa
Sorpresa (feat. Maicol & Manuel)
Sigo Vivo
Bien Arrebatao
Legalicen

References

Master Joe & O.G. Black albums
2014 compilation albums